is a Japanese judoka who competed in the Athens 2004 Olympics and the Beijing 2008 Olympics. Ueno was born in Asahikawa Hokkaidō. In 2004, she earned Japan's fifth Olympic Gold Medal in ten events, taking the 70 kg women's judo event. She also won the Olympic Gold Medal in 2008.

Her younger sisters, Yoshie is World champion in 2009 and Tomoe is World junior champion in 2006.

References

External links
 
 Video footage of Masae Ueno (judovision.org)

Japanese female judoka
Olympic judoka of Japan
Judoka at the 2000 Summer Olympics
Judoka at the 2004 Summer Olympics
Judoka at the 2008 Summer Olympics
Olympic gold medalists for Japan
People from Asahikawa
1979 births
Living people
Olympic medalists in judo
Asian Games medalists in judo
Medalists at the 2008 Summer Olympics
Judoka at the 2002 Asian Games
Judoka at the 2006 Asian Games
Medalists at the 2004 Summer Olympics
Asian Games gold medalists for Japan
Asian Games bronze medalists for Japan
Recipients of the Medal with Purple Ribbon
Medalists at the 2002 Asian Games
Medalists at the 2006 Asian Games
21st-century Japanese women